The University of St. Thomas School of Law is one of the professional graduate schools of University of St. Thomas in Minnesota, United States. It is one of three law schools in Minneapolis–Saint Paul.  It currently enrolls 434 students. St. Thomas Law is accredited by the American Bar Association. It is also a member of The Association of American Law Schools. The University of St. Thomas School of Law is the second highest ranked law school in Minnesota amongst the state's three law schools. Founded in 1999, the School of Law graduated its first class in 2004.

History
St. Thomas Law was founded in 1923, but closed in 1933 in the wake of the Great Depression. The law school re-opened in 1999 with a class of 120 students in the fall of 2001.  David T. Link, then dean of Notre Dame Law School, was named founding dean of St. Thomas School of Law in July 2001. St. Thomas Law was accredited by the American Bar Association in 2006 and became a member of the American Association of Law Schools in 2012.

Campus

St. Thomas Law is located in downtown Minneapolis. The 158,000 square foot building opened in 2003, and sits at the corner of 11th Street and LaSalle Avenue. The $34.8 million building includes a four-story atrium, a  law library, a two-story chapel, and a classically designed moot court room. The law school is connected by skyway to the downtown Minneapolis legal and business communities.

Mentor Externship Program
Students at St. Thomas Law participate in a mentor externship program where students are partnered with lawyers and judges to experience the law in practice. St. Thomas Law is one of two law schools in the country that offer more externships than full-time enrollment. In 2005, the Mentor Externship Program was awarded the E. Smythe Gambrell Professionalism Award by the American Bar Association Standing Committee on Professionalism. It was ranked the #1 law school in the nation for having the most externship placements per full-time student in 2010, 2011 and 2013. (The Mentor Externship Program matches each J.D. student with a mentor during all three years of law school.)

Clinics
In 2016, for the first time, St. Thomas Law ranked in the U.S. News & World Report "Best Law Clinics" at #27.

Employment outcomes and cost
According to St. Thomas's ABA-required employment disclosures, 54.9% of the Class of 2017 obtained full-time, bar-passage required jobs within 9 months of graduation. St. Thomas Law's Law School Transparency under-employment score is 21.7%, indicating the percentage of the Class of 2016 who were unemployed, pursuing an additional degree, or working in a non-professional, short-term or part-time job 10 months after graduation.

Tuition at St. Thomas School of Law for the 2016–17 academic year is $39,870. The estimated cost-of-living for St. Thomas students is $20,641.

Rankings
The University of St. Thomas School of Law is ranked #126 by U.S. News & World Report, making it the second highest ranking law school in Minnesota.
The school is ranked #1 in the U.S. for practical training by National Jurist.
The school is ranked #1 in the U.S. for having the most externship placements per full-time student in 2010, 2011 and 2013 by National Jurist. The school's Mentor Externship program matches every current law student with a mentor during all three years of law school.
In 2011, 2013, 2014, 2015 and 2016, St. Thomas law professors ranked in the top 10 on Princeton Review's "Best Professors" list. The faculty currently is ranked at #8 in the nation.
The school was ranked between #1 to #5 for the "Best Quality of Life for Students" by the Princeton Review for five straight years from 2004 to 2009 and again from 2014 to 2016, where the school currently sits at #5.
The school is ranked #10 in the U.S. as a Best Value Private Law School by National Jurist.
The scholarly impact of the School of Law's faculty ranked #30 out of 200 law schools nationwide, using the methodology developed by University of Chicago law professor Brian Leiter.

Student body profile

The JD class of 2019 is made up of 131 students. 47% are female and 53% are male. 16% of the class represents minority students. The median undergraduate GPA was a 3.35 and the median LSAT score was 153. Roughly 50% of the student body identifies as Catholic.

Curriculum
St. Thomas Law is best known for its emphasis on relationships, practical training and social justice. The school offers the three-year Juris Doctor, as well as combined degrees: the JD/MBA, the JD/MA in Catholic studies, the JD/MSW and the JD/LLM in organizational ethics and compliance. St. Thomas Law also offers master's and LL.M. programs in organizational ethics and compliance, and an LL.M. in U.S. Law. Beginning in January 2018, it will offer an online LL.M. program in organizational ethics and compliance.

Some of the most popular programs of study include courses in the areas of family and community law, public policy, civil procedure, advocacy, environmental law, international law, as well as human rights law. St. Thomas Law students are placed at the top firms and companies in the Midwest through the On Campus Interview program and through the extensive mentorship program. The school has a 12.8:1 student to faculty ratio.

Publications 
St. Thomas Law has two journals that are published regularly, University of St.Thomas Law Journal, and University of St. Thomas Journal of Law and Public Policy.

Terrence J. Murphy Institute for Catholic Thought, Law and Public Policy
The Terrence J. Murphy Institute for Catholic Thought, Law and Public Policy is a partnership between the Center for Catholic Studies and the School of Law at the University of St. Thomas. The Institute explores the various interactions between law and Catholic thought on topics ranging from workers' rights to criminal law to marriage and family.

Holloran Center for Ethical Leadership in the Professions
The Holloran Center for Ethical Leadership in the Professions is one of 13 national centers in law schools devoted to ethics and professionalism that is recognized by the American Bar Association's Center for Professional Responsibility.

Notable faculty

 Rachel Moran, lawyer
 Jake Sullivan – National Security Advisor-designate for President Joe Biden
Mark Osler, author and critic of capital punishment in the United States. At St. Thomas, he founded the nation's first law school clinic on federal commutations,[3] and he has advocated for an expansive use of the presidential pardon power.[4]
Robert Delahunty, author of controversial memos under the Bush Administration related to the applicability of the Geneva Conventions to the War on Terror
Nekima Levy-Pounds, lawyer, professor, activist, writer, and preacher. She was elected in 2015 to be the president of the Minneapolis chapter of the NAACP and in 2016 announced her candidacy for mayor of Minneapolis. She left her job at St. Thomas Law in July 2016.
Thomas Berg, legal scholar

References

1923 establishments in Minnesota
Catholic law schools in the United States
Educational institutions established in 1923
Law schools in Minnesota
Universities and colleges in Minneapolis
Law